George Cornelius may refer to:

 George Cornelius (Secretary), former Secretary of the Pennsylvania Department of Community and Economic Development
 George Cornelius (footballer) (1874–1966), Australian rules footballer
 George Cornelious, bishop of the diocese of Krishna-Godavari of the Church of South India

See also
 George Cornelius Gorham (1787–1857), vicar in the Church of England